Isognathus allamandae is a moth of the  family Sphingidae. It is found from Brazil to Venezuela.

The wingspan is 68 mm for males and 78 mm for females. It is similar to Isognathus australis but has narrower wings and the forewing upperside is more uniform grey. There is a yellow band running along the inner margin of the forewing upperside. The basal area of the hindwing underside is yellow.

There are probably multiple generations per year. Adults have been recorded in June.

The larvae have been recorded feeding on Allamanda blanchetii and Allamanda cathartica. Pupation takes place in cocoons spun amongst leaf litter.

References

Isognathus
Moths described in 1920